Galatasaray Judo is the Judo section of Galatasaray S.K., a major sports club in Istanbul, Turkey. There is also a Judo school in Burhan Felek Sports Complex.

Female judo champion Majlinda Kelmendi became the first Kosovan athlete to win a gold medal at the Olympic Games in 2016 while a member of the Galatasaray team.

Honors

Turkish Championship
Turkish Judo Team Championship:
Winners (3) : 2011, 2012, 2013
 1985: 
 2006: 
 2010 Mümine Demir (70 kg) 
 2010 Derya Çidem (48 kg)

Turkish Senior Championship

 2007:

İstanbul Championship

 2007:

International
 2014:  European Judo Club Championships 2014
 2012:  Galatasaray Judo Team - 2012 European Judo League 
 2012:  Bayram Ceylan - 2010 European Under 23 age Judo Championships Men's 73 kg
 2010:  Ramila Yusubova - 2010 World Judo Championships Women's 63 kg
 2010:  Kifayat Gasimova - 2010 Judo Grandslam - Tokyo, Japan
 2011:  Belkıs Zehra Kaya - 2011 World Cup Women - Rome, Italy October 1–2

External links
 Galatasaray SK Official Web Site

References

Galatasaray Judo
Judo organizations
Judo in Turkey
1984 establishments in Turkey
Sports clubs established in 1984